The Hyderabad ePrix is a race of the single-seater, electrically powered Formula E race held in Hyderabad, India. It was first held as part of the 2022–23 Formula E World Championship season and was the first Formula E race to be held in the country.

History
Hyderabad was one of a number of Indian cities bidding to host a round of the FIA Formula E Championship, although it was only seriously considered after the COVID-19 pandemic had halted the discussions between the FIA and proposed hosts in Delhi and Mumbai.  On 17 January 2022 the Government of Telangana signed a "letter of intent" with Formula E to stage the Hyderabad E-Prix, with a planned debut as a round of the 2022–23 season, towards the start of the season. The Hyderabad E-Prix was subsequently listed on the first provisional calendar for 2022–23 Formula E World Championship as the fourth round of the season, with an initial date of 11 February 2023. The Hyderabad E-Prix is set to be staged on the Hyderabad Street Circuit, which was proposed to be set up on the banks of the artificial Hussain Sagar Lake, which was set to host its first event, a round of the Indian Racing League, in 2022.

Circuit

The initial design of the track, which was designed with help from PPE Racing, a Filipino constructor and race track designer, was heavily criticised by drivers, with Norman Nato describing it as "looking like a dildo" after he drove on the track in a simulator. The track was later redesigned by Driven International, who also designed the 2021 layout of the Yas Marina Circuit in Abu Dhabi and the reception was positive.

References 

Hyderabad
Hyderabad
Hyderabad
Hyderabad ePrix